Mexico Academy & Central School District is a school district in Mexico, New York, United States.

The district operates five schools: Mexico High School, Mexico Middle School, Mexico Elementary, New Haven Elementary and Palermo Elementary.

District 
The District offices are located at 16 Fravor Rd, Mexico, NY.

Administration 
Mr. Sean Bruno–Superintendent of Schools
Ms. Mary Beth Horn–Assistant Superintendent for Curriculum and Instruction 
Ms. Elizabeth DiCosimo–Assistant Superintendent for Teaching and Learning
Ms. Sheilla Roth–School Business Executive

Board of Education 
Mr. James Emery;President (2017)
Ms. Darlene Upcraft–Vice President (2017)
Mr. Chad Bigelow (2018)
Mr. Dennis Brooks (2019)
Ms. Connie Douglas (2019)
Ms. Amy Shaw (2018)
Ms. Sue Teifke (2017)

Selected Former Superintendents 
Dr. Robert R. Pritchard
Mr. Nelson Bauersfeld
Mr. Michael Havens
Mr. G. Scott Hunter–?-2005
Mr. Michael A. Maroun–2005-2006

Mexico High School 

Mexico High School is located at 3338 Main Street and serves grades 9 through 12. The current principal is Mr. Ryan Lanigan, and the current assistant principal is Mr. James Busco.

History

Selected former principals 
Mr. Gary Smith–?-2003
Ms. Jeannie Henry–2003-2006
Ms. Judith Belfield–2006-2008

Selected former assistant principals 
Previous assignment and reason for departure denoted in parentheses
Mr. Gerald J. Maclauso–1978-1981 (Social Studies teacher - Liverpool High School, named Principal of Mynderse Academy)

Mexico Middle School 

Mexico Middle School is located at 16 Fravor Road and serves grades 5 through 8.

History

Selected Former Principals 
Mr. William Kamalsky ?-2006

Mexico Elementary School 

Mexico Elementary School is located at 26 Academy Street and serves grades K through 4.

History

Selected former principals 
Ms. Carol Pallas
Ms. Judith Belfield–?-2006
Mr. Nick Piulizzi–2006-2009
Mr. Robert Briggs–2006-2011

New Haven Elementary 

New Haven Elementary is located at 4320 State Route 104 and serves grades K through 4.

History

Selected former principals 
Mrs. Ann Pia

Palermo Elementary 

Palermo Elementary is located at 1638 County Route 45 in Palermo and serves grades K through 4. The current principal is Mrs. Margaret Scorzelli.

History

Selected former principals 
Ms. Jane Fargo
Mr. Louis Carbone–?-2004
Mary Sylvester–2004-2007

References

External links
Official site

School districts in New York (state)
Education in Oswego County, New York